Justice Herbert may refer to:

Charles Edward Herbert, judge of the Central Court of Papua and an acting judge of the Supreme Court of the Northern Territory 
Edward Herbert (judge), chief justice of the King's Bench in the United Kingdom
Paul M. Herbert, associate justice of the Supreme Court of Ohio
Thomas J. Herbert, associate justice of the Supreme Court of Ohio
Thomas M. Herbert, associate justice of the Supreme Court of Ohio
William Herbert, 2nd Earl of Pembroke, chief justice of South Wales